A Place of Greater Safety is a 1992 novel by Hilary Mantel. It concerns the events of the French Revolution, focusing on the lives of Georges Danton, Camille Desmoulins, and Maximilien Robespierre from their childhood through the execution of the Dantonists, and also featuring hundreds of other historical figures.

Background
Although Mantel began writing the novel in 1975 and completed it in 1979, she was initially unable to find a publisher. “I wrote a letter to an agent saying would you look at my book, it’s about the French Revolution, it’s not a historical romance, and the letter came back saying, we do not take historical romances. They literally could not read my letter, because of the expectations surrounding the words ‘French Revolution’—that it was bound to be about ladies with high hair." The novel remained unpublished until 1992. Mantel explains that, where possible, she used the historical figures' own words, from their speeches or writings.

Reception
A Place of Greater Safety won the Sunday Express Book of the Year award.

The New York Times praised Mantel, but not the book, wondering if "more novel and less history might not better suit this author's unmistakable talent."

References

1992 British novels
Novels set in the French Revolution
Novels by Hilary Mantel
Works about Georges Danton
Works about Maximilien Robespierre
Cultural depictions of Georges Danton
Cultural depictions of Maximilien Robespierre
Viking Press books